All That Jazz most frequently refers to:
 "All That Jazz" (song), from the 1975 stage musical Chicago
 All That Jazz (film), 1979 musical drama by Bob Fosse

All That Jazz may also refer to:

In music
 "All That Jazz" (Mel Tormé song), recorded for the 1966 film A Man Called Adam, and subsequently released on the 1997 reissue of Right Now!
 All That Jazz (Breathe album), released 1988 
 All That Jazz (Ella Fitzgerald album), released 1989
 All That Jazz: The Best of Ute Lemper, released 1998
 "All That Jazz", song by Echo & the Bunnymen from Crocodiles (1980) 
 "All That Jazz", song by DJ Fresh from Escape from Planet Monday (2006)
 All That Jazz (band), Japanese band commissioned by Studio Ghibli to make jazz covers of their soundtracks

In TV and radio
 "All That Jazz", 1961 episode of Top Cat
 "All That Jazz" (The Golden Girls), 1989 episode
 "All That Jazz" (radio series), 1990 sitcom featuring Wendy van der Plank
 "All That Jazz" (Sealab 2021), 2001 episode
 I Am Jazz, reality series with working title All That Jazz, first broadcast in 2015

See also
Love and All That Jazz